State Highway 258 (SH 258) is a short state highway in northern Texas.

Route description
SH 258 begins at  SH 25 in the rural community of Kadane Corner. The highway runs eastward, just north of the Archer County line. The route ends at a junction with  US 82 / US 277 southwest of Wichita Falls.

History
SH 258 route was designated on December 2, 1937 along its current route.

Major intersections

References

258
Transportation in Wichita County, Texas